Hope Farm or New Hope Farm may refer to:

In Australia
 Hope Farm, a large park within the Cattai National Park near Sydney, New South Wales

In Europe 
 Hope Farm, Cambridgeshire, England, arable farm belonging to the RSPB
Hope Farm, Ellesmere Port, Cheshire, England

In the United States (by state)
 Hope Farm (Natchez, Mississippi), listed on the NRHP in Adams County, Mississippi
 Hope Farm (Millbrook, New York)
 Mount Hope Farm, Bristol, Rhode Island, NRHP-listed
 New Hope Farm (Wellford, South Carolina), listed on the NRHP in Spartanburg County, South Carolina
 New Hope Farm (Mission Hill, South Dakota), site of two NRHP-listed structures
 New Hope Farm Polygonal Barn, Mission Hill, South Dakota, listed on the NRHP in Yankton County, South Dakota
 New Hope Farm Swine Barn, Mission Hill, South Dakota, listed on the NRHP in Yankton County, South Dakota